Rose Hill Acres is a city in Hardin County, Texas, United States. The population was 441 at the 2010 census, down from 480 at the 2000 census. The city consists of two residential neighborhoods situated between Beaumont and Lumberton. It is part of the Beaumont–Port Arthur Metropolitan Statistical Area. Rose Hill Acres has a small government structure led by Mayor David Lang.

Rose Hill Acres is served by the Lumberton Independent School District and the Lumberton Municipal Utility District.

Geography

Rose Hill Acres is located in extreme southern Hardin County, at  (30.195811, –94.194094). It is bounded on the south by Pine Island Bayou, an east-flowing tributary of the Neches River. Road access is provided by U.S. Highway 69, U.S. Highway 96, and U.S. Highway 287, all three of which run concurrently in one freeway, collectively referred to as the Eastex Freeway.

Historical development
This residential suburb of Beaumont was incorporated in 1968 by a 70 to 9 margin.

Demographics

As of the census of 2000, there were 480 people, 169 households, and 141 families residing in the city. The population density was 1,185.9 people per square mile (463.3/km). There were 175 housing units at an average density of 432.4 per square mile (168.9/km). The racial makeup of the city was 96.88% White, 0.83% Native American, 0.21% Asian, 0.42% Pacific Islander, 0.62% from other races, and 1.04% from two or more races. Hispanic or Latino of any race were 4.79% of the population.

There were 169 households, out of which 37.3% had children under the age of 18 living with them, 74.6% were married couples living together, 5.9% had a female householder with no husband present, and 16.0% were non-families. 13.0% of all households were made up of individuals, and 10.1% had someone living alone who was 65 years of age or older. The average household size was 2.84 and the average family size was 3.11.

In the city, the population was spread out, with 27.3% under the age of 18, 5.6% from 18 to 24, 24.2% from 25 to 44, 25.6% from 45 to 64, and 17.3% who were 65 years of age or older. The median age was 40 years. For every 100 females, there were 96.7 males. For every 100 females age 18 and over, there were 90.7 males.

The median income for a household in the city was $50,313, and the median income for a family was $55,179. Males had a median income of $42,500 versus $23,750 for females. The per capita income for the city was $19,215. About 7.1% of families and 8.1% of the population were below the poverty line, including 11.7% of those under age 18 and 6.4% of those age 65 or over.

References

External links
City of Rose Hill Acres

Cities in Hardin County, Texas
Cities in Texas
Beaumont–Port Arthur metropolitan area